Paul Robert Pooley (born August 2, 1960 in Exeter, Ontario) is a former professional ice hockey player who played 15 games in the National Hockey League with the Winnipeg Jets. He played his college hockey at Ohio State, where his number 22 has been retired. He is currently the associate head coach for Notre Dame's men's ice hockey team, a position he has held since 2005.

Career statistics

Regular season and playoffs

Head coaching record

College

Awards and honours

References

External links

1969 births
Living people
Canadian ice hockey right wingers
Fort Wayne Komets players
Ice hockey people from Ontario
Kingston Canadians players
Ohio State Buckeyes men's ice hockey players
People from Huron County, Ontario
Providence Friars men's ice hockey coaches
Sherbrooke Canadiens players
Canadian twins
Undrafted National Hockey League players
Winnipeg Jets (1979–1996) players
AHCA Division I men's ice hockey All-Americans